The Mamiya RZ67 is a professional medium format single-lens reflex system camera manufactured by Mamiya.  There are three successive models: the RZ67 Professional (first model released in 1982), RZ67 Professional II (released in 1993) and RZ67 Professional IID (released in 2004). It is primarily designed for studio use, but can also be used in the field.

The RZ67 name is adopted from the model name of the Mamiya RB67, which was first introduced in 1970.

Details
The RZ67 is a modular camera system, meaning lenses, viewfinders, ground glasses, film winders and film backs are all interchangeable. It is primarily designed for studio use, but can also be used in the field. The RZ67 Sekor lenses have built-in electronic leaf shutters which are cocked and triggered from the body. Focusing is performed with a bellows on the body instead of the lenses.

The camera accepts 6×7, 6×6 and 6×4.5, 120 and 220 film magazines and Polaroid as well as Quadra 72 4×5 sheet film backs. Mamiya RB67 backs are also supported via the G-Adapter. The film speed is set on each RZ back via a dial. There are two versions of the 6×7 and 6×4.5 backs; the model II versions have a second film counter to always show the film count on the top.

The RZ67 operates on one 6 V silver oxide 4SR44 battery, or 6 V 4LR44 alkaline battery. It can be used in emergency mode fully mechanically with a fixed 1/400 sec shutter speed. Multiple exposures are possible in the M-mode. Mirror flip up is supported. The body has one standard flash hot shoe on its left side, one plug for a standard remote shutter cable release, and a socket for an electronic shutter trigger. The RZ67 measures 104 mm (W) × 133.5 mm (H) × 211.5 mm (L) with the 110mm  lens, and weighs approximately 2.4 kg (5.29 lbs). The flange distance is 105 mm.

The RZ67 name is adopted from the model name of the Mamiya RB67 (in which RB stands for "Revolving Back"), which was first introduced in 1970, thus the RZ67 also takes backs which can be rotated 90 degrees to provide a horizontal or vertical composition. The orientation is shown in the viewfinder with black guides. The viewfinder also hosts LEDs informing of the state of the camera (flash ready, low battery, dark slide not removed, shutter not cocked).

In addition to manual operation (photographer chooses aperture and shutter speed), the RZ67 is able to operate in AEF mode with an AE viewfinder (AE being an abbreviation for automatic exposure), which transmits exposure information directly to the body. In RBL compatibility mode, the RZ67 is able to use RB67 lenses.

The biggest difference between RB67 and RZ67 is that the RB67 is completely mechanical. The RZ67 has also mechanical couplings between the parts, but the shutter is electronic, and parts are able to transmit exposure information with electronic couplings. In addition, the RZ67 has plastic exterior body, which makes it somewhat lighter.

Versions
Original RZ67 Professional (RZ67 Pro I):
 Electronic shutter 8 sec:  sec with full EV steps

RZ67 Professional II (RZ67 Pro II):
 Some improvements of the electronics
 An additional knob was added to the right side of the focusing unit for fine tuning of the focus
 Shutter can be adjusted in 0.5 EV steps

RZ67 Professional IID (RZ67 Pro IID):
 Has an integrated interface for communicating with digital backs (the earlier versions need either an interface plate or external triggering wires)
 Minor internal mechanical improvements

Lenses 

There are a wide variety of lenses available for the RZ67:

 Four wide-angle lenses:
 43 mm . prototype lens. ULD glass, floating system and aspherical. 21 mm equivalent
 50 mm . Two versions exist, the non ULD and ULD L (contains floating element), the ULD version is clearly marked. 24 mm equivalent
 65 mm , two versions (the second one has a floating element), 32 mm equivalent
 75 mm , with floating element, 36 mm equivalent
 Three normal lenses:
 90 mm , with extension tubes 1 and 2 has the largest magnification of all RZ67 lenses, able to shoot 1.92:1. A prototype lens of 90 3.5 M L-A with floating system also exists. 44 mm equivalent
 110 mm , smallest of the RZ lenses, also has largest aperture, 53 mm equivalent
 127 mm  and an older model , 62 mm equivalent
 Eight telephoto lenses:
 150 mm , 73 mm equivalent
 180 mm , three generations,W-N version is the latest and has improved optics, 87 mm equivalent
 210 mm  APO, apochromatically corrected design, 102 mm equivalent
 250 mm , 2 versions (newer one is APO), 121 mm equivalent
 350 mm  APO, 170 mm equivalent
 360 mm , an older lens, 175 mm equivalent
 500 mm  APO and an older model , longest of the RZ lenses, 238 mm equivalent
 Seven specialty lenses:
 37 mm  Fisheye, (the widest RZ lens), captures 180 degrees diagonally across the frame, does not correct distortion, 18 mm equivalent
 75 mm  Short Barrel, possible to use with a tilt/shift adapter for perspective and focus plane control, needs an SB spacer for normal 75 mm use, 36 mm equivalent
 75 mm  Shift, perspective control lens, needs manual cocking of the shutter, 36 mm equivalent
 140 mm  Macro, two versions - "Mamiya M Macro L-A" and "Mamiya-Sekor Macro Z W" (both containing floating element system with "M" being the newer of the two, producing better results), able to shoot 1:3 without extension tubes or bellows and 1.22:1 with extension tubes 1 and 2, 68 mm equivalent
 180 mm  Variable Soft Focus, uses three interchangeable diffusion and spherical aberration disks for soft effect, 87 mm equivalent
 180 mm  Short Barrel, for tilt and shift adapter, needs an SB spacer for normal 180 mm use, 87 mm equivalent
 100-200 mm  Zoom, the only RZ zoom lens, 48-97 mm equivalent
 Most RB67 lenses which are mechanical only

All lenses have internal electronic Seiko #1 shutters with a maximum 1/400 sec speed, PC-type X flash sync plug, T-switch for long exposures, a plug for standard remote cable release for B exposures, depth of field preview lever, distance scale, aperture adjust ring. In "B" mode, the RZ67 models will expose up to 30 seconds (a warning beep will sound for the last 10 seconds). In "T" mode, the camera can expose indefinitely without drawing power from the battery. Most lenses, except for the 37 mm, 75 mm shift lenses and the 500 mm lenses have 77 mm filter threads on the front of the lens. The 75 mm shift lenses and the 500 mm lenses have 105 mm filter threads. Some lenses have a floating element; focusing these lenses involves setting a subject distance ring on the lens after focusing with the bellows.

Accessories 

 Waist level viewfinder with a magnifier loupe (interchangeable with different dioptre adjusts)
 AE prism, prism and chimney viewfinders
 Vertical split image, matte, matte with corners, checker (default), microprism, crosshair and rangefinderspot microprism ground glasses
 Variable dioptre flip-up magnifier for RB and RZ prism finders
 G-2 Bellows lens hood (a simpler version of the G-3 Bellows lens hood)
 G-3 Bellows lens hood (65–350 mm lens adjustable)
 Bellows front hood extension for G-3 bellows lens hood
 100–200 mm zoom lens mounting ring, prevents G-3 from rotating when zooming
 Gelatine filter holder for 50–350 mm lenses
 Adjustable sun shield plate
 Metz SCA 395 flash module
 Hot shoe PC flash adapter
 Quick shoe for fast attaching and detaching for tripods
 Mirror-up dual cable release (attaches both to body and lens)
 External battery case for keeping battery warm in cold weather
 Electromagnetic cable release
 Left hand grip (L-Grip) and U-shaped Aerial Grip, these attach to the electronic coupling on the body
 Adjustable flash bracket 
 Infrared transmitter and receiver
 Tilt/Shift adapter for 75 mm and 180 mm SB lenses, with special electronic cable release adapter
 Ground glass for Tilt/Shift adapter
 Power winder, winds 1 frame per 1.5 sec, uses six AA cells, attaches to the base of the body
 1.4× tele converter for best use with 90 mm, 110 mm, 127 mm, 140 mm, 180 mm and 100–200 mm lenses
 45 mm and 82 mm auto extension tubes, electronically coupled
 short barrel spacer for use with the 75 mm and 180 mm short barrel lenses without the Tilt/Shift adapter at infiniti
 viewfinder masks for the 6×6 cm and 6×4.5 cm backs

Polaroid also made a radio transmitter and receiver for the RZ series.

Famous photos
Arguably the most famous photo taken with this camera is the "Bliss" photo used as the default background for Microsoft Windows XP. Seen by many millions of people every day, this photo was taken by photographer Charles O'Rear in 1996.

RZ67 was used by Annie Leibovitz for many of her famous works in the 1980s and 1990s

References

Further reading 
 Bob Shell (1995). Mamiya Pro Guide. Hove Foto Books, Newpro, Faringdon Oxon., UK. .

External links
In English:
 RZ67II Review in ephotozine (2001) by David Tarn
 Mamiya RZ Lens Table by Christoph Sensen
 Mamiya RZ Closeup Tables for Film Backs by Christoph Sensen
 Man behind famous Windows XP wallpaper

In French:
 Mamiya RZ67 on www.collection-appareils.fr by Sylvain Halgand

In Japanese:
 The 6×4.5 and 6×7 SLRs in the Camera Museum of the Mamiya official website, covers the original RZ67 Professional

120 film cameras
Mamiya SLR cameras

ja:マミヤ・オーピーのカメラ製品一覧#マミヤRZ67シリーズ